(born October 10, 1979) is a virtuoso violinist from the United States. She currently tours internationally as a concert artist. She released her second CD in May 2007 called "Recital!". Since then, she has released "Live at Kennedy Center", and the most recent release "Encore"with acclaimed pianist Akira Eguchi. She shared second prize awarded at the 2002 International Tchaikovsky Competition, the highest prize awarded in 2002.

Tamaki Kawakubo is currently touring in Japan and Europe.

Early years
Tamaki was born in Palos Verdes, California. She began violin studies at the age of five in Los Angeles. She studied with Robert Lipsett at the R.D. Colburn School of Performing arts in Los Angeles. Following this she studied with Dorothy DeLay and Masao Kawasaki at the Juilliard School of performing arts. In 1997 she won an Avery Fisher Career Grant and moved to Zürich to study with Zakhar Bron.

Career
Tamaki was placed second equal and received a Silver Medal at the 2002 International Tchaikovsky Competition. This was the highest place awarded that year. Tamaki has also won first prize at the 2001 Pablo de Sarasate International Violin Competition. After collaborating with Michael Tilson Thomas and the New World Symphony in 2001-02, Ms Kawakubo began her 2002-03 season in the United States with the San Francisco Symphony. Since then she has appeared as a soloist with many international orchestras.

She has played the La Cathedrale violin, a Stradivarius (previously played by Nigel Kennedy) that was loaned to her when she was selected as a Mandell artist.

Recordings
Avex Classics released in 2003 a debut CD of concertos by Mendelssohn and Tchaikovsky. In May 2007 her second CD called Recital! was released receiving high praise from many music magazines.

Film
Tamaki Kawakubo performed the Chaconne from John Corigliano's soundtrack to the film The Red Violin with the New York ensemble Eos Orchestra. She is also featured on the soundtrack for the cartoon series Little Amadeus.

References

External links
 Promotional Site

American classical musicians of Japanese descent
Living people
1979 births
American classical violinists
21st-century violinists
American women musicians of Japanese descent